The Heart of the Matter (1948) is a novel by English author Graham Greene. The book details a life-changing moral crisis for Henry Scobie. Greene, a former British intelligence officer in Freetown, British Sierra Leone, drew on his experience there. Although Freetown is not mentioned in the novel, Greene confirms the location in his 1980 memoir, Ways of Escape.

The Heart of the Matter was enormously popular, selling more than 300,000 copies in the United Kingdom upon its release. It won the 1948 James Tait Black Memorial Prize for fiction. In 1998, the Modern Library ranked The Heart of the Matter 40th on its list of the 100 best English-language novels of the 20th century. In 2005, the novel was chosen by Time magazine as one of the one hundred best English-language novels from 1923 to the present. In 2012, it was shortlisted for the Best of the James Tait Black.

The book's title appears halfway through the novel: "If one knew, he wondered, the facts, would one have to feel pity even for the planets? If one reached what they called the heart of the matter?"

Plot summary
Major Scobie lives in a  colony on the west coast of Africa during World War II, and is responsible for local security during wartime. His wife Louise, an unhappy, solitary woman who loves literature and poetry, cannot make friends. Scobie feels responsible for her misery, but does not love her. Their only child, Catherine, died in England several years before. Louise is a devout Catholic. Scobie, a convert, is also devout.

Throughout the novel the oppressive nature of the climate is a major backdrop. The heat and humidity act as weakening factors.

Scobie is passed over for promotion to commissioner, which upsets Louise both for her personal ambition and her hope that the local British community will begin to accept her. Louise asks Scobie if she can go to live in South Africa to escape a  life she hates.

At the same time, a new inspector, named Wilson, arrives in the town. He is priggish and socially inept, and hides his passion for poetry for fear of ostracism by his colleagues. He and Louise strike up a friendship, which Wilson mistakes for love. Wilson rooms with another colleague named Harris, who has created a sport for himself of killing the cockroaches that appear in his room each night. He invites Wilson to join him, but in the first match, they end up quarrelling over the rules of engagement.

One of Scobie's duties is to lead the inspections of local passenger ships, particularly looking for smuggled diamonds, a needle-in-a-haystack problem that never yields results. A Portuguese ship, the Esperança (the Portuguese word for 'hope'), comes into port, and a disgruntled steward reveals the location of a letter hidden in the captain's quarters. Scobie finds it, and because it is addressed to someone in Germany, he confiscates as it might contain secret codes and clandestine information. The captain says it's a letter to his daughter and begs Scobie to forget the incident, offering him a bribe of one hundred pounds when he learns that they share the Catholic faith. Scobie declines the bribe and takes the letter, but having opened and read it—contrary to regulations—and finding it innocuous, he decides not to submit it to higher authorities, and burns it.

Scobie is called to a small inland town to deal with the suicide of the local inspector, a man named Pemberton, who was in his early twenties and left a note implying that his suicide was due to a loan he could not repay. Scobie suspects the involvement of the local agent of a Syrian man named Yusef, a local black marketeer. Yusef denies it, but warns Scobie that the British have sent a new inspector specifically to look for diamonds; Scobie claims this is a hoax and that he does not know of any such man. Scobie later dreams that he is in Pemberton's situation, even writing a similar note, but when he awakens, he tells himself that he could never commit suicide, as no cause is worth the eternal damnation that suicide would bring.

Scobie tries to secure a loan from the bank to pay the two hundred pound fare for Louise's passage, but is turned down. Yusef offers to lend Scobie the money at four per cent per annum. Scobie initially declines, but after an incident where he mistakenly thinks Louise is contemplating suicide, he accepts the loan and sends Louise to South Africa. Wilson meets them at the pier and tries to interfere with their parting.

Shortly afterwards, the survivors of a shipwreck arrive after forty days at sea in lifeboats. One young girl dies as Scobie tries to comfort her by pretending to be her father, who was killed in the wreck. A 19-year-old woman named Helen Rolt also arrives malnourished and dehydrated, clutching an album of postage stamps. She was married before the ship left port and is now a widow with a wedding ring too big for her finger. Scobie feels drawn to her, as much to the cherished album of stamps as to her physical presence, even though she is not beautiful. She reminds him of his daughter.

He soon starts a passionate affair with her, all the time aware that he is committing the grave sin of adultery. A letter he writes to Helen ends up in Yusef's hands, and the Syrian uses it to blackmail Scobie into sending a package of diamonds for him via the departing Esperança, thus avoiding the authorities.

After Louise unexpectedly returns, Scobie struggles to keep her ignorant of his love affair. But he is unable to renounce Helen, even in the confessional, where the priest instructs him to think it over and postpones absolution. Still, to placate his wife, Scobie attends Mass with her and receives communion in his state of mortal sin—a sacrilege according to Catholic doctrine. Soon after, Yusef's servant delivers a "gift" to Scobie, which he refuses. Scobie's servant, Ali, however, witnesses this and a romantic embrace between Scobie and Helen. Scobie visits Yusef to confront him about the gift, but also to relate his suspicion that Ali, whom he had trusted for all of their 15 years together, is disloyal. Yusef says he will take care of the matter, which within a few hours ends up with Ali being killed by local teenagers known as "wharf rats". The reader is led to believe that Yusef arranged the killing for which Scobie blames himself.

Having gone this far down the path of ruin and seeing no way out, Scobie decides to free everyone from himself—including God—and plots his death by faking a heart ailment and getting a prescription for sleeping pills. Knowing full well that suicide is the ultimate damnation according to Church doctrine, he proceeds in the end to commit suicide with the pills. The act, however, yields ambiguous results. Helen continues her dreary existence. And Louise, who knew about the affair all along, is made to realise by her suitor, Wilson, that Scobie's death was a suicide. She tells Wilson she will not marry him, but might in time.

The concluding chapter consists of a short encounter between Louise and her confessional priest. Louise tries to rationalise Scobie's suicide in relation to his Catholicism, to which the priest advises that no one can know what's in a person's heart or about God's mercy.

Characters
 Major Henry Scobie – Longtime police deputy commissioner and protagonist of the novel.
 Louise Scobie – Henry's devout Catholic wife.
 Catherine Scobie – Deceased daughter of Henry and Louise.
 Ali – Scobie's longtime African servant.
 Edward Wilson – New inspector who spies on Major Scobie and is in love with his wife, Louise.
 Harris – Wilson's housemate
 "Dicky" Pemberton – Inspector who commits suicide due to his large debt to Yusef.
 Helen Rolt – Newly arrived widow who becomes Scobie's mistress.
 Yusef – Syrian local black marketeer who blackmails Scobie after finding a letter in which he expresses his love for Helen.
 Tallit – Catholic Syrian, Yusef's chief competitor.
 Father Rank – Local Catholic priest.
 Father Clay – Catholic priest at Bamba who reads about saints.

Critical response
Anthony Burgess wrote that Graham Greene's, "...ability to encapsulate the essence of an exotic setting in a single book is exemplified in The Heart of the Matter". Burgess's contemporary, Evelyn Waugh, an admirer of the book, stated that the West Africa of that book replaced the true remembered West Africa of his own experience. The closing part of Waugh's 1952 novel Men at Arms is set in Freetown in late 1940 and includes two favourable references to The Heart of the Matter.  In the first, Waugh writes of his protagonist Guy Crouchback, "Later when he came to read The Heart of the Matter Guy reflected, fascinated, that at this very time 'Scobie' was close at hand, demolishing partitions in native houses, still conscientiously interfering with neutral shipping." A little further on Waugh adds, "... later a few printed pages would create, not recall, the scene for him [Guy] and make it forever memorable.  People would say to him in eight years time: 'You were there during the war. Was it like that?' and he would answer: 'Yes.  It must have been.'"

In 1998, the Modern Library ranked The Heart of the Matter 40th on its list of the 100 best English-language novels of the 20th century.

George Orwell found the plot of the novel "ridiculous". Orwell charged that, "The fact that the book is set in Africa while the action takes place almost entirely inside a tiny white community gives it an air of triviality." Major Scobie, in Orwell's opinion, is not a credible character: "If he believed in Hell, he would not risk going there merely to spare the feelings of a couple of neurotic women. And one might add that if he were the kind of man we are told he is—that is, a man whose chief characteristic is a horror of causing pain—he would not be an officer in a colonial police force".

Film
The novel was made into a film in 1953, directed by George More O'Ferrall and starring Trevor Howard and Maria Schell, and a TV film version was produced in 1983, featuring Jack Hedley as Scobie.

References

External links 

 
 

Novels by Graham Greene
1948 British novels
Novels set in Sierra Leone
British novels adapted into films
Adultery in novels
Catholic novels
Fiction about suicide
Heinemann (publisher) books